

England

Head Coach: Clive Woodward

 Neil Back
 Iain Balshaw
 Steve Borthwick
 Kyran Bracken
 Mike Catt
 Ben Cohen
 Martin Corry
 Lawrence Dallaglio
 Matt Dawson (c.)*
 David Flatman
 Phil Greening
 Will Greenwood
 Danny Grewcock
 Austin Healey
 Richard Hill
 Martin Johnson (c.)
 Jason Leonard
 Dan Luger
 Lewis Moody
 Matt Perry
 Mark Regan
 Jason Robinson
 Graham Rowntree
 Simon Shaw
 Mike Tindall
 Phil Vickery
 Dorian West
 Julian White
 Jonny Wilkinson
 Trevor Woodman
 Joe Worsley

*captain in the last game

France

Head Coach: Bernard Laporte

 David Auradou
 Olivier Azam
 Abdelatif Benazzi
 Philippe Bernat-Salles
 Serge Betsen
 Sébastien Bonetti
 David Bory
 Christian Califano
 Philippe Carbonneau
 Franck Comba
 Pieter de Villiers
 Christophe Dominici
 Richard Dourthe
 Pepito Elhorga
 Alessio Galasso
 Fabien Galthié
 Xavier Garbajosa
 Stéphane Glas
 Raphaël Ibañez
 Christophe Juillet
 Christophe Lamaison
 Fabrice Landreau
 Christophe Laussucq
 Thomas Lièvremont
 Thomas Lombard
 Olivier Magne
 Sylvain Marconnet
 Gérald Merceron
 Christophe Milheres
 Christophe Moni
 Lionel Nallet
 Fabien Pelous (c.)
 Jean-Luc Sadourny
 David Skrela

Ireland

Head Coach: Warren Gatland

 Trevor Brennan
 Emmet Byrne
 Peter Clohessy
 Jeremy Davidson
 Kieron Dawson
 Girvan Dempsey
 Guy Easterby
 Simon Easterby
 Anthony Foley
 Mick Galwey
 John Hayes
 Rob Henderson
 Denis Hickie
 Shane Horgan
 Tyrone Howe
 David Humphreys
 Gary Longwell
 Kevin Maggs
 Eric Miller
 Michael Mullins
 Geordan Murphy
 Brian O'Driscoll
 Ronan O'Gara
 Malcolm O'Kelly
 Brian O'Meara
 Alan Quinlan
 Frankie Sheahan
 Peter Stringer
 David Wallace
 Andy Ward
 Keith Wood (c.)

Italy

Head Coach: Brad Johnstone

 Mauro Bergamasco
 Carlo Caione
 Carlo Checchinato
 David Dal Maso
 Denis Dallan
 Manuel Dallan
 Giampiero de Carli
 Andrea De Rossi
 Diego Dominguez
 Filippo Frati
 Ezio Galon
 Andrea Gritti
 Giuseppe Lanzi
 Andrea Lo Cicero
 Luca Martin
 Matteo Mazzantini
 Giampiero Mazzi
 Alessandro Moscardi (c.)
 Andrea Muraro
 Tino Paoletti
 Aaron Persico
 Salvatore Perugini
 Massimiliano Perziano
 Ramiro Pez
 Corrado Pilat
 Walter Pozzebon
 Franco Properzi
 Juan Manuel Queirolo
 Giovanni Raineri
 Marco Rivaro
 Andrea Scanavacca
 Cristian Stoica
 Alessandro Troncon
 Wilhelmus Visser
 Maurizio Zaffiri

Scotland

Head Coach: Ian McGeechan

 Alan Bulloch
 Gordon Bulloch
 James Craig
 George Graham
 Stuart Grimes
 Andrew Henderson
 Duncan Hodge
 John Leslie
 Martin Leslie
 Kenny Logan
 Gordon McIlwham
 James McLaren
 Glenn Metcalfe
 Richard Metcalfe
 Cameron Murray
 Scott Murray
 Andy Nicol (c.)
 Chris Paterson
 Jon Petrie
 Budge Pountney (c.)*
 Bryan Redpath
 Robbie Russell
 Steve Scott
 Gordon Simpson
 Tom Smith
 Jon Steel
 Mattie Stewart
 Simon Taylor
 Gregor Townsend
 Jason White

*captain in the last game

Wales

Head Coach: Graham Henry

 Chris Anthony
 Allan Bateman
 Colin Charvis
 Gareth Cooper
 Leigh Davies
 Scott Gibbs
 Ian Gough
 Gavin Henson
 Rob Howley
 Dafydd James
 Lee Jarvis
 Garin Jenkins
 Neil Jenkins
 Spencer John
 Mark Jones
 Stephen Jones
 Andrew Lewis
 Geraint Lewis
 Robin McBryde
 Rupert Moon
 Andy Moore
 Kevin Morgan
 Darren Morris
 Dwayne Peel
 Craig Quinnell
 Scott Quinnell
 Brett Sinkinson
 Mark Taylor
 Gareth Thomas
 Gavin Thomas
 Iestyn Thomas
 Barry Williams
 Martyn Williams
 Rhys Williams
 Shane Williams
 Chris Wyatt
 Dai Young (c.)

External links

Six Nations Championship squads
squads